Nicolás Cuestas Cardozo (born 8 December 1986) is a Uruguayan long distance runner who specialises in the marathon. He competed in the men's marathon event at the 2016 Summer Olympics. In 2019, he competed in the men's marathon at the 2019 World Athletics Championships held in Doha, Qatar. He finished in 55th place. In 2020, he competed in the men's race at the 2020 World Athletics Half Marathon Championships held in Gdynia, Poland.

His twin brother Martín also specialises in marathon.

References

External links
 

1986 births
Living people
Uruguayan male long-distance runners
Uruguayan male marathon runners
Place of birth missing (living people)
Athletes (track and field) at the 2016 Summer Olympics
Olympic athletes of Uruguay
Athletes (track and field) at the 2019 Pan American Games
Pan American Games competitors for Uruguay
World Athletics Championships athletes for Uruguay